The 2019 Asian Rowing Championships were the 19th Asian Rowing Championships and took place from 23 to 27 October 2019, in Tangeum Lake International Rowing Regatta, Chungju, South Korea.

Medal summary

Men

Women

Medal table

References

External links
Asian Rowing Fedeation

Rowing Championships
Asian
Asian Rowing Championships
International sports competitions hosted by South Korea
Asian Rowing Championships